Thomas Patrick Mullen (born November 11, 1951) is a former American football offensive lineman who played five seasons in the National Football League with the New York Giants and St. Louis Cardinals. He was drafted by the New York Giants in the second round of the 1974 NFL Draft. He played college football at Southwest Missouri State University and attended St. John Vianney High School in Kirkwood, Missouri. Mullen is a brother of Sigma Phi Epsilon fraternity.
Married Connie Wilson Mullen

References

External links
Just Sports Stats
Missouri State Bears bio

Living people
1951 births
Players of American football from St. Louis
American football offensive linemen
Missouri State Bears football players
New York Giants players
St. Louis Cardinals (football) players